Darreh Bidad may refer to:
 Darreh Bidad-e Olya
 Darreh Bidad-e Sofla